Griffiths Stadium is a stadium located on the grounds of the  University of Saskatchewan in Saskatoon, Saskatchewan. The current stadium was opened on June 23, 1967 to host the Saskatchewan Huskies football team. There was previously a Griffiths Stadium 200 metres to the east of the current location from October 3, 1936 until the new site was opened.

In 2005, the University of Saskatchewan received a $5 million donation from PotashCorp to improve the facilities to meet the requirements of hosting the 2006 Vanier Cup. In recognition of this donation, the University of Saskatchewan renamed the fields surrounding the stadium Potash Corp Park. Improvements included Next Generation FieldTurf, expanded seating capacity (to 4,997), improved washroom facilities, and improved dressing room facilities. The 2006 Vanier Cup was a sellout of 12,567 fans, with temporary seating added for the event.

The Saskatchewan Huskies football team of the Canada West Universities Athletic Association (CWUAA) of CIS are the only current resident of the facility. It has previously been used by soccer teams and the Saskatoon Hilltops of the CJFL. Griffiths Stadium also hosted the 2004 and 2005 Mitchell Bowl games, the 1998 and 1989 Churchill Bowls, as well as numerous Hardy Trophy games.

On June 23, 2010, it was announced that the Graham Huskies Clubhouse, which was originally built in 2006 with a dressing room, meeting room and offices for the coaching staff, will be expanded with a new two-storey building to the east of the current clubhouse. Thanks to a $3 million donation from Ron and Jane Graham, who donated $1.2 million to construct the original clubhouse, and $160,000 from David Dubé and Heather Ryan, who have funded many things Huskie Football (including the gameday fireworks, championship flags, inflatable mascots, and team jerseys), the Huskies will have a new building that will include a gym, multiple meeting rooms, coaches offices, and a rooftop viewing deck.

The first-floor training center will be outfitted with six lifting stations, including an Olympic lifting platform, a lifting power cage, and dumbbell stations as well as a number of cardio areas. There will also be a narrow Field-Turf track, about 25 meters long, which will allow for some winter speed training and agility work. When players are working out, they will be using brand new equipment and have an incredible view of Griffiths Stadium through large windows.

The second floor will be used for meetings. There is one small permanent meeting room and one large permanent meeting room. The large room will sit approximately 100 people. This room can be divided into three smaller meeting rooms, allowing the Huskies to meet as a team or in individual groups. Players and coaches will be able to watch game film together or on their own.

There will be a mechanical and film center on the third floor and there are plans for a rooftop patio which can be used during Griffith Stadium events.

With this addition comes a new work flow for the Huskies and their coaches. A new video scouting system has been purchased and the team will have 11 stations to view video (up from five this year). There will be new HD TVs, projectors, cameras and the same film software capabilities that NFL teams use. The clubhouse will get some new furniture and an upgraded sound system, among other details.

Griffiths Stadium was expanded in August and September 2011, adding 1,174 seats.   Funding for the new seats will be provided by University of Saskatchewan Alumni David Dube and his wife Heather Ryan. Ten rows of seats were added to the east side stands between the 30 yard lines. These seats are premium seats which are wider, have more leg room, featuring armrests and cup holders. These seats are modeled after stadium seats in NFL stadiums.

Gallery

References

External links

 Campus Buildings - Griffiths Stadium
 Satellite view of Griffiths Stadium on Google Maps

Buildings and structures in Saskatoon
Saskatchewan Huskies football
Canadian football venues
Athletics (track and field) venues in Canada
Soccer venues in Saskatchewan
Sports venues in Saskatchewan
1967 establishments in Saskatchewan
Sports venues completed in 1967